The 1938–39 Chicago Black Hawks season was the team's 13th season in the NHL, and they were coming off a very surprising Stanley Cup victory in 1937–38. The club was hoping to build on that success in a bid for a 2nd straight Stanley Cup.

Pre-season
In July 1938, Chicago GM and vice-president Bill Tobin was named president of the club by Major McLaughlin.

The Montreal Maroons announced they would be folding, leaving the NHL with 7 teams, thus eliminating the need for divisions.

Regular season
The Black Hawks would get off to a mediocre start, and after an 8–10–3 start, they would dismiss head coach Bill Stewart and replace him with player-coach Paul Thompson. The Hawks would struggle under Thompson, going 4–18–5, and finish in last place in the NHL, missing the playoffs for the 2nd time in 3 years.  Chicago would continue having problems scoring goals, getting an NHL low 91 goals, while they gave up the 3rd most goals at 132.

Team captain Johnny Gottselig would lead the team offensively, getting team highs in goals (16), assists (23) and points (39). Joffre Desilets and Mush March would be the only other Hawks with double digit goals, with 11 and 10 goals respectively.  Earl Seibert would anchor the defense, scoring 15 points and having a team high 57 penalty minutes.

In goal, Mike Karakas would be the starter, winning 12 games, earning 5 shutouts, and posting a GAA of 2.65.

A year after their unexpected Stanley Cup championship, the Black Hawks would become the only team in the league to miss the playoffs, as they finished 7 points behind the 6th place team, the Montreal Canadiens.

Final standings

Record vs. opponents

Schedule and results

Playoffs
The Black Hawks did not qualify for the playoffs.

Player statistics

Scoring leaders

Goaltending

Transactions

See also
 1938–39 NHL season

References

National Hockey League Guide & Record Book 2007

External links
SHRP Sports
The Internet Hockey Database

Chicago Blackhawks seasons
Chicago
Chicago